Shri Krishna University is a private university in Chouka, Sagar Road, Chhatarpur, Madhya Pradesh, India. It was established in 2018.

References

External links
 

Private universities in India
Educational institutions established in 2018
2018 establishments in Madhya Pradesh